Marc Noël (born October 31, 1948) is the Chief Justice of the Canadian Federal Court of Appeal.

References

1948 births
Living people
Judges of the Federal Court of Appeal (Canada)
University of Ottawa Faculty of Law alumni
Place of birth missing (living people)
21st-century Canadian judges